Benton County is a county located in the U.S. state of Mississippi. As of the 2020 census, the population was 7,646. Its county seat is Ashland.

It is locally believed that residents convinced the post-Civil War Reconstruction government that Benton County was named after U.S. Senator Thomas Hart Benton, but the name actually honored Confederate Brigadier General Samuel Benton of nearby Holly Springs in Marshall County, nephew of the senator.

Benton County is included in the Memphis, TN-MS-AR Metropolitan Statistical Area.

Geography

It is the fifth-smallest county by area in Mississippi.

The headwaters of the Wolf River meander and braid their way north and west across northern Benton County from Baker's Pond, the river's source spring (highest origin of continuous flow) in the Holly Springs National Forest approximately one mile southwest of where U.S. Highway 72 passes into Tippah County, Mississippi. The Wolf River passes into Fayette County, Tennessee between Michigan City (on the Mississippi side) and La Grange, Tennessee.

Major highways
  Interstate 22
  U.S. Route 72
  U.S. Route 78
  Mississippi Highway 2
  Mississippi Highway 4
  Mississippi Highway 5
  Mississippi Highway 7
  Mississippi Highway 178
  Mississippi Highway 370

Adjacent counties
 Hardeman County, Tennessee (northeast)
 Tippah County (east)
 Union County (south)
 Marshall County (west)
 Fayette County, Tennessee (northwest)

National protected area
 Holly Springs National Forest (part)

Demographics

2020 census

As of the 2020 United States Census, there were 7,646 people, 3,149 households, and 2,082 families residing in the county.

2000 census
At the 2000 census, there were 8,026 people, 2,999 households and 2,216 families residing in the county. The population density was 20 per square mile (8/km2). There were 3,456 housing units at an average density of 8 per square mile (3/km2).  The racial makeup of the county was 57.12% White (non-Hispanic), 39.76% Black or African American, 0.59% Native American, 0.05% Asian, 0.01% Pacific Islander, 0.29% from other races, and 0.59% from two or more races. 3.5% of the population were Hispanic or Latino of any race.

There were 2,999 households, of which 33.40% had children under the age of 18 living with them, 54.20% were married couples living together, 14.80% had a female householder with no husband present, and 26.10% were non-families. 23.80% of all households were made up of individuals, and 11.70% had someone living alone who was 65 years of age or older.  The average household size was 2.64 and the average family size was 3.12.

Age distribution was 26.90% under the age of 18, 10.00% from 18 to 24, 25.80% from 25 to 44, 22.00% from 45 to 64, and 15.30% who were 65 years of age or older. The median age was 36 years. For every 100 females there were 94.60 males. For every 100 females age 18 and over, there were 91.80 males.

The median household income was $24,149, and the median family income was $29,907. Males had a median income of $26,291 versus $19,519 for females. The per capita income for the county was $12,212. About 19.20% of families and 23.20% of the population were below the poverty line, including 28.00% of those under age 18 and 24.80% of those age 65 or over.

Communities

Towns
 Ashland (county seat)
 Hickory Flat
 Snow Lake Shores

Census-designated place
 Lamar

Unincorporated places
 Canaan
 Hopewell
 Michigan City
 Winborn

Extinct town
 Salem

Education
Benton County School District operates public schools.

From 1965 to the late 1980s, Benton County was also home to Gray's Academy, a private segregation school located in Ashland.

Notable people
 Norris C. Williamson, member of the Louisiana State Senate, 1916 to 1932; worked to eradicate cattle tick pest, born in Benton County in 1874
 Floyd Lee (1933–2020), was a blues musician who was a founding member of Music Under New York, and later a judge on their board. He was born in Lamar.

Politics

In presidential elections, Benton County was historically a 'Solid South' county for most of the 20th century, voting Republican only in the Nixon and Reagan landslides of 1972 and 1984, as well as for Goldwater in 1964. It also voted for third-party candidates Strom Thurmond in 1948 and George Wallace in 1968, instead of for the regular Democratic tickets. In the 21st century, it has trended Republican. In 2008, it was one of forty-four counties to switch from John Kerry to John McCain. It was the only one of these forty-four to flip back to Obama in 2012, in kind with a scattering of counties in or near the Black Belt, but Trump carried it in 2016 with 56%, the highest vote share the county had given any nominee since 1996. In 2020, Trump improved his vote share in the county by 3.9%, approaching 60% even as he lost nationally.

See also
 Dry counties
 National Register of Historic Places listings in Benton County, Mississippi

Further reading

 DeBerry, Roy; Futorian, Aviva; Klein, Stephen; Lyons, John. 2020. Voices from the Mississippi Hill Country: The Benton County Civil Rights Movement. University Press of Mississippi.

References

 
Mississippi counties
Counties of Appalachia
1870 establishments in Mississippi
Populated places established in 1870